Gonzalo Condarco is a Bolivian sculptor. His works are on display in the National Art Museum (Bolivia) in La Paz and the Museo de Arte Antonio Paredes Candia in El Alto.

References

Bolivian sculptors
Living people
Year of birth missing (living people)